Amkor Technology, Inc. is a semiconductor product packaging and test services provider. The company has been headquartered in Tempe, Arizona, since 2005, when it was moved from West Chester, Pennsylvania. The company was founded in 1968 and, has approximately 31,000 employees worldwide and a reported $7.1 billion in sales.

With factories in China, Japan, Korea, Malaysia, Philippines, Portugal, Taiwan and Vietnam, Amkor is a leading player in the semiconductor industry. It designs, packages and tests integrated circuits (ICs) for chip manufacturers.

History
In 2000, Amkor acquired Integra Technologies, an Outsourced Semiconductor Assembly And Test (OSAT) provider in United States. In 2005, Amkor spun off Integra Technologies.

In February 2016, Amkor fully acquired J-Devices Corp, the largest Outsourced Semiconductor Assembly And Test (OSAT) provider in Japan.

In June 2017, Amkor Technology was recognized as Supplier of the Year for 2016 by Qualcomm Technologies for a second consecutive year.

Amkor Technology has competitiveness for chip assembly by thermal compression as well as wafer level packaging. In September 2018, Amkor Technology opened manufacturing and test plant at Longtan Science Park in Taiwan.

In 2019, Amkor Technology was ranked 2nd in overall revenue in the OSAT (Outsourced Semiconductor Assembly and Test) market.
 ASE Technology – $11.87 Billion
 Amkor Technology – $7.1 Billion
 JCET – $3.97 Billion
 SPIL – $2.79 Billion
 Powertech Technology – $2.17 Billion

See also
 Semiconductor industry
 Integrated circuit packaging
 Wafer-level packaging
 System in a package

References

External links

 

Companies based in Tempe, Arizona
Semiconductor companies of the United States
Manufacturing companies based in Arizona
Assembly and Test semiconductor companies
Companies listed on the Nasdaq